Bhadayasa, also Bhadrayasha (Kharosthi:), was a minor Indo-Scythian ruler in the areas of Eastern Punjab and Mathura in India, during the 1st century CE. He is considered one of the Northern Satraps.

He is mainly known through his coins, which are direct imitations of those of the Indo-Greek king Zoilos II, or the hypothetical Zoilos III.

Bhadayasa is generally considered a successor of Rajuvula in the Eastern Punjab. However, since his coinage is copied from Zoilos II or Zoilos III rather than the later Strato II or Strato III (whom Rajuvula imitated), Jakobsson places Bhadayasa before the rule of these last kings, around 35 BCE.

At around the same time, the Indo-Scythian ruler Sodasa, son of Rajuvula, ruled in Mathura.

Notes

Indo-Scythian kings
1st-century Indian monarchs
1st-century Iranian people